Valmiki is a name used by a variety of communities throughout India who all claim descent from the author of the Ramayana, Valmiki. The Valmikis can be classified as a caste or Sampradaya (tradition/sect).  In the North West Punjab region, this caste had adopted Sikhism. They were given the task of engaging in war. The Indian British government recruited them in their army and declared them a martial caste. During the Indian Rebellion of 1857, many valmiki were prominent freedom fighters. Notable examples include Matadin Bhangi, Gangu Mehtar, Bhura Singh Valmiki. At the present time many changes have been seen in this caste, now they incline towards politics and government high positions.

According to the 2001 Census of India, the Valmikis formed 11.2 per cent of the Scheduled Caste population in Punjab and were the second-most populous Scheduled Caste in Delhi National Capital Region.
The 2011 Census of India for Uttar Pradesh showed the Valmiki population, which was classified as a Scheduled Caste, as 1,319,241.

South India
In South India the term is mainly used as a self-identification by the Boya or Bedar caste, a traditional hunting and martial caste who are considered as Backward castes now changed by government of Andhra Pradesh into scheduled Tribes in Andhra Pradesh, Most Backward caste (MBC) in Tamil Nadu and Scheduled Tribe in Karnataka. The Valmikis are mainly concentrated in Anantapur, Kurnool and Kadapa districts of Andhra Pradesh and in Bellary, Raichur and Chitradurga districts of Karnataka, although they are spread all over the state. They also built a temple of Valmiki in Anantapur, Andhra Pradesh. In Andhra Pradesh they are known as Boya Valmikis or Valmikis.

Other countries
In the UK, the Council of Valmiki Sabhas UK claims to represent the Valmiki.

See also
Mazhabi Sikh
Matadin Bhangi
Madakari Nayaka
Bhai Jiwan Singh
Bhura Singh Valmiki
Gangu Baba
Sikh Light Infantry
Valmiki
Bhagwan Valmiki Tirath Sthal
Balmikism
Valmiki Ashram

References

Dalit communities
Hindu communities
Scheduled Castes of Punjab
Scheduled Castes of Uttar Pradesh
Scheduled Castes of Gujarat
Scheduled Castes of Madhya Pradesh
Scheduled Castes of Delhi
Scheduled Castes of Haryana
Scheduled Castes of Chhattisgarh
Scheduled Castes of Assam
Scheduled Castes of Jammu and Kashmir
Scheduled Castes of Bihar
Scheduled Castes of Himachal Pradesh
Scheduled Castes of Odisha
Scheduled Tribes of Andhra Pradesh